Sir Geoffrey Palmer, 3rd Baronet (1655–1732) of East Carlton Hall, Northamptonshire was a British landowner and Tory politician who sat in the House of Commons from 1708 to 1722

Palmer was born on  12 June 1655, the eldest son of  Sir Lewis Palmer, 2nd Baronet of Carlton Park, Northamptonshire and his wife Jane, Palmer, daughter of Robert Palmer of Carlton Scroop, Lincolnshire. He was admitted at Trinity College, Cambridge in 1672. He married Elizabeth Grantham, daughter  of Thomas Grantham of Goltho, Lincolnshire. and Rievaulx Abbey, Yorkshire on 2 February 1681.

Palmer was appointed a Gentleman of the Privy Chamber in about 1704, a post he held until 1714. In 1707, he stood unsuccessfully at a by-election for Leicestershire but a year later at the 1708 general election he topped the poll for the constituency. He was an inactive Member, but voted against the impeachment of Dr Sacheverell in 1710. He was re-elected MP for Leicestershire in  1710 and was listed  as a ‘Tory patriot’ who voted for the peace in April 1711, and as a ‘worthy patriot’ who took part in exposing the mismanagements of the previous ministry. He did not stand at the 1713 general election, probably for financial reasons. In April 1713, his financial constraints were lifted when he succeeded to the estates of his father and the baronetcy. He was returned again as MP for Leicestershire at a by-election on 5 August 1714.

At the 1715 general election there was initially no return in February and the election was held again in  April. The contests proved expensive and Palmer decided not to stand at the  1722 general election.

Palmer died without issue on 29 December 1732 and was succeeded by his nephew Thomas Palmer.

References

1655 births
1732 deaths
Alumni of Trinity College, Cambridge
British MPs 1708–1710
British MPs 1710–1713
British MPs 1713–1715
British MPs 1715–1722
Members of the Parliament of Great Britain for Leicestershire
Baronets in the Baronetage of England